Aleksandr Ivanovich Blagonravov (– 28 May 1962) was a Soviet military engineer and designer who worked on the designs of armoured vehicles prior to, during, and after the Second World War.

His work included the epicyclic gearing mechanisms employed on the T-34 and IS-2 tank designs, the latter work winning him the Stalin Prize in 1943. He took up leadership roles in the People's Commissariat of Defence of the Soviet Union towards the end of the war, later serving in the Scientific-Tank Committee in the Ministry of Defence's Main Armoured Directorate, and as Head of the Tank Department of the Military Academy of Mechanization and Motorization of the Red Army.

Blagonravov wrote a number of academic works, was a Candidate of Technical Sciences, and a docent, while reaching the rank of Engineer Lieutenant General. He had received several awards, including the Order of the Red Star, the Order of Lenin, and the Medal "For Battle Merit", prior to his death in 1962. His son, Aleksandr Aleksandrovich Blagonravov, followed in his father's footsteps, serving as chief designer of Kurganmashzavod and playing an important role in the development of the BMP-2 and BMP-3 infantry fighting vehicles.

Early life and design work

He joined the Communist Party in 1929, and served in the Red Army from 1930.
Alongside  he developed the epicyclic gearing used in the T-34 tank, and participated in the development of the IS-2 heavy tank, creating a two-stage planetary rotation mechanism for the tank's engines. From 1944 onwards was part of the leadership of the People's Commissariat of Defence of the Soviet Union. He was awarded the Stalin Prize in 1943 after the People's Commissar for Tank Industry  wrote to the prize committee, requesting the prize for the "Creation of the KV-1S heavy tank". 
 Credited alongside Blagonravov, listed at this period of his career as an engineer-podpolkovnik and teacher at the I. V. Stalin Military Academy of Mechanization and Motorization, were Nikolai Dukhov, Leonid Sychev, German Mikhailovich, Aleksandr Sternin, Yevgeny Dedov,  and Abram Lesokhin.

Leadership roles and teaching
Blagonravov later became chairman of the Scientific-Tank Committee of the Main Armoured Directorate of the Ministry of Defence, and between 1959 and 1962 was head of the Directorate. Between 1951 and 1954 he was Head of the Tank Department of the Military Academy of Mechanization and Motorization of the Red Army. 

Blagonravov co-wrote several works on tank design and operation and was the author of the 1940 work Tanks and Tractors: Design and Construction. He was a Candidate of Technical Sciences, and docent, reaching the rank of Engineer Lieutenant General.

Blagonravov died in Moscow on 28 May 1962 and was buried in the Novodevichy Cemetery. Over his career he had received the Order of the Red Star on 22 February 1941, the Order of Lenin on 13 September 1945, and the Medal "For Battle Merit".

Family
Blagonravov married Elizaveta Alekseevna Zvereva (1905–1991), a lieutenant colonel, head of production workshops, and a lecturer at the Military Armoured Forces Academy. On her death in 1991, she was buried beside her husband in the Novodevichy Cemetery. Their son, Aleksandr Aleksandrovich Blagonravov, followed in his father's footsteps, serving as chief designer of Kurganmashzavod and playing an important role in the development of the BMP-2 and BMP-3 infantry fighting vehicles.

References

1906 births
1962 deaths
People from Rasskazovsky District
People from Tambovsky Uyezd
Communist Party of the Soviet Union members
Soviet lieutenant generals
Soviet mechanical engineers
Soviet military engineers
Soviet inventors
Stalin Prize winners
Recipients of the Order of Lenin
Recipients of the Order of the Red Banner
Recipients of the Order of the Red Star
Burials at Novodevichy Cemetery